Antonio Cicognara (1480 – after 1500), was a 15th-century Italian painter.

Biography
Little more is known of him than that he was born in Cremona and died in Ferrara. He is known for religious works.

References

1480 births
1500s deaths
15th-century Italian painters
Italian male painters
16th-century Italian painters
Painters from Cremona
Painters from Ferrara